Fiala (feminine Fialová) is a surname of Czech origin, meaning "violet". It may refer to:

Anthony Fiala (1869–1950), American explorer
Art Fiala (1899–2005), one of the last surviving American World War I veterans
Barbara J. Fiala (born 1944), Commissioner of the New York State Department of Motor Vehicles
Benno Fiala von Fernbrugg (1890–1964), Austro-Hungarian fighter ace
Bohuslav Fiala, retired Czechoslovak slalom canoeist
Bohuslav Fiala (general) (1890–1964), Czechoslovak brigadier general
Daniel Fiala (born 1972), Czech former professional tennis player
Eman Fiala (actor) (1899–1970), Czechoslovak film actor and composer
Ernst Fiala (automotive engineer) (born 1928), Austrian automotive engineer
Jakub Fiala (born 1975), former alpine and Olympic skier
Jan Fiala (born 1956), Czech footballer
Jean-Pierre Fiala (born 1969), Cameroonian footballer
Jim Fiala, American chef
John Fiala (born 1973), retired American football linebacker
Josef Fiala (1748–1816), composer, musician and pedagogue
Karel Fiala (1925–2020), Czech operatic tenor and actor
Karl Fiala (born 1956), former motorcycle speedway rider
Kevin Fiala (born 1996), Swiss ice hockey player
Kristina Fialová, Czech classical violist
Květa Fialová, Czech actress
Lucie Fialová (born 1988), Czech squash player
Martin Fiala (born 1968), retired Czech-born German freestyle skier
Neil Fiala, former Major League Baseball player
Ondřej Fiala (born 1987), Czech ice hockey player
Petr Fiala (born 1964), Czech politician, prime minister
Radek Fiala (born 1986), Czech ice hockey goaltender
Radim Fiala (born 1969), Czech politician and businessman
Severin Fiala (born 1985), Austrian filmmaking duo with Veronika Franz
Stephen Fiala (born 1967), Republican Party lawmaker from New York City
Tony Fiala (born 1966), Canadian former Olympic biathlete
Veronika Franz and Severin Fiala (born 1965 and 1985), Austrian filmmaking duo
Zbyněk Fiala (born 1964), Czech former cyclist
Zuzana Fialová (born 1974), Slovak actress

See also 
3695 Fiala (1973 UU4) is a Main-belt Asteroid discovered in 1973
Beck-Fiala theorem, major theorem in discrepancy theory due to József Beck and Tibor Fiala
Fiala expedition aka Ziegler Polar Expedition of 1903–1905, a failed attempt to reach the North Pole
Fialová legie, a paramilitary organization founded in 1936 in Czechoslovakia, which belonged to the Czechoslovak Traders' Party
Fiola
Fiałkowo

Czech-language surnames
Slovak-language surnames